The ceremonial county of Dorset (which comprises the unitary authorities of Dorset, and Bournemouth, Christchurch and Poole)
is divided into 8 parliamentary constituencies
- 3 borough constituencies
and 5 county constituencies.

Constituencies

2010 boundary changes

Under the Fifth Periodic Review of Westminster constituencies, the Boundary Commission for England decided to retain Dorset's constituencies for the 2010 election, making minor changes to realign constituency boundaries with the boundaries of current local government wards, and to reduce the electoral disparity between constituencies.

Proposed boundary changes 
See 2023 Periodic Review of Westminster constituencies for further details.

Following the abandonment of the Sixth Periodic Review (the 2018 review), the Boundary Commission for England formally launched the 2023 Review on 5 January 2021. Initial proposals were published on 8 June 2021 and, following two periods of public consultation, revised proposals were published on 8 November 2022. Final proposals will be published by 1 July 2023.

The commission has proposed retaining the current constituencies in Dorset, as detailed below, with minor boundary changes to reflect changes to ward boundaries following the reorganisation of local government authorities within the county.

Containing electoral wards from Bournemouth, Christchurch and Poole

 Bournemouth East
 Bournemouth West
 Christchurch (part)
 Mid Dorset and North Poole (part)
 Poole

Containing electoral wards from Dorset (unitary authority)

 Christchurch (part)
 Mid Dorset and North Poole (part)
 North Dorset
 South Dorset
 West Dorset

Results history
Primary data source: House of Commons research briefing - General election results from 1918 to 2019

2019 
The number of votes cast for each political party who fielded candidates in constituencies comprising Dorset in the 2019 general election were as follows:

Percentage votes 
Note that before 1983 Dorset did not include the Bournemouth and Christchurch areas (see below).

11950-1979: Liberal Party; 1983 & 1987 - SDP-Liberal Alliance

* Included in Other

Accurate vote percentages are not applicable for the 1918 election because one candidate stood unopposed.

Seats 

11950-1979: Liberal Party; 1983 & 1987 - SDP-Liberal Alliance

Maps

Historical representation by party
A cell marked → (with a different colour background to the preceding cell) indicates that the previous MP continued to sit under a new party name.

1885 to 1950

1original candidate, F. Guest (Lib), disqualified; fresh by-election held June 1910

1950 to 1983

1983 to present (7, then 8 MPs)

See also
 List of constituencies in South West England

Notes

References
Template:Dorset constituencies

Dorset
Politics of Dorset
 Dorset
 
Parliamentary constituencies